The following genera belong to the family Pentatomidae, stink bugs. There are almost 5000 species in ~940 genera of 10 subfamilies worldwide.

Partial list of Pentatomidae genera

 Acesines Stål, 1876
 Acledra Signoret, 1864
 Acoloba Spinola, 1850
 Acrocorisellus Puton, 1886
 Acrosternum Fieber, 1860
 Adoxoplatys Breddin, 1903
 Adria Stål, 1876
 Adustonotus 
 Aegaleus Stål, 1876
 Aelia Fabricius, 1803
 Aeliomorpha Stål, 1858
 Aenaria Stål, 1876
 Aeschrocoris Bergroth, 1887
 Afrania Stål, 1864
 Afrius Stål, 1870
 Agaeus Dallas, 1851
 Agonoscelis Spinola, 1837
 Agroecus Dallas, 1851
 Alcaeorrhynchus Bergroth, 1891
 Alcaeus Dallas, 1851
 Alcimocoris Bergroth, 1891
 Allopodops Harris & Johnston, 1936
 Amasenus Stål, 1864
 Amaurochrous Stål, 1872
 Amblycara 
 Amyotea Ellenrieder, 1862
 Anaca Bergroth, 1891
 Anaxilaus Stål, 1876
 Anchises Stål, 1867
 Ancyrosoma Amyot & Serville, 1843
 Andrallus Bergroth, 1905
 Anolcus Bergroth, 1893
 Antestia Stål, 1864
 Antestiopsis Leston, 1952  (variegated coffee bug)
 Antheminia Mulsant & Rey, 1866
 Antiteuchus Dallas, 1851
 Apateticus Dallas, 1851
 Aplerotus Dallas, 1851
 Apodiphus Spinola 1837
 Apoecilus Stål, 1870
 Arma Hahn 1832
 Arocera Spinola, 1837
 Arvelius Spinola, 1840
 Asaroticus Jakovlev, 1884
 Ascra Say, 1832
 Aspavia Stål, 1865
 Aspideurus Signoret, 1880
 Atelocera Laporte, 1832
 Austromalaya Kirkaldy, 1908
 Auxentius Horváth, 1915
 Avicenna Distant, 1901
 Axiagastus Dallas, 1851
 Bagrada Stål, 1862
 Banasa Stål, 1860
 Basicryptus Herrich-Schäffer, 1844
 Bathrus Dallas, 1851
 Bathycoelia 
 Berecynthus Stål, 1862
 Biprorulus Breddin, 1900
 Boerias Kirkaldy, 1909
 Bolbocoris Amyot & Serville, 1843
 Brachycerocoris Costa, 1863
 Brachycoris Stål, 1870
 Brachymna Stål, 1861
 Brachynema Mulsant & Rey, 1852
 Brachystethus Laporte de Castelnau, 1833
 Brepholoxa Van Duzee, 1904
 Brochymena Amyot & Serville, 1843  (rough stink bugs)
 Bromocoris Horváth, 1915
 Brontocoris 
 Cantheconidea Schouteden, 1907
 Capnoda Jakovlev, 1887
 Cappaea Ellenrieder, 1862
 Carbula Stal 1876
 Carpocoris Kolenati 1846
 Catacanthus Spinola, 1837
 Caura Stål, 1864
 Caystrus Stål, 1861
 Cazira Amyot & Serville, 1843
 Cephaloplatus White, 1842
 Ceratozigum 
 Cermatulus Dallas, 1851
 Chalazonotum Ribes & Schmitz, 1992
 Chalcocoris Dallas, 1851
 Chalcopis Kirkaldy, 1909
 Chinavia Orian, 1965  (green stink bugs)
 Chlorochroa Stål, 1872
 Chlorocoris Spinola, 1837
 Chroantha Stl, 1872
 Codophila Mulsant & Rey, 1866
 Coenomorpha Dallas, 1851
 Coenus Dallas, 1851
 Coleotichus White, 1839
 Colpocarena Stål, 1868
 Commius Stål, 1876
 Comperocoris Stål, 1867
 Conquistator 
 Coquerelia 
 Coryzorhaphis Spinola, 1837
 Cosmopepla Stål, 1867
 Cratonotus 
 Cresphontes Stål, 1867
 Critheus Stål, 1867
 Crypsinus Dohrn, 1860
 Cuspicona Dallas, 1851
 Cyptocephala Berg, 1883
 Cyrtocoris White, 1842
 Dalpada Amyot & Audinet-Serville, 1843
 Dalsira Amyot & Serville, 1843
 Degonetus Distant, 1902
 Delegorguella Spinola, 1850
 Dendrocoris Bergroth, 1891
 Deroploa Westwood, 1835
 Derula Mulsant & Rey, 1856
 Diaphyta Bergroth, 1891
 Dichelops Spinola, 1837
 Dictyotus Dallas, 1851
 Diemenia 
 Dinocoris Burmeister, 1835
 Dinorhynchus Jakovlev, 1876
 Diplorhinus Amyot & Serville, 1843
 Diploxys Amyot & Serville, 1843
 Discocephala Laporte, 1833
 Discocera de Laporte, 1832
 Dolycoris Mulsant & Rey, 1866
 Dorycoris Mayr, 1864
 Doryderes Amyot & Serville, 1843
 Dryadocoris Kirkaldy, 1909
 Dryptocephala Laporte de Castelnau, 1833
 Durmia Stål, 1864
 Dybowskyia Jakovlev, 1876
 Dyroderes Spinola 1837
 Ealda Walker, 1867
 Ectenus Dallas, 1851
 Edessa Fabricius, 1803
 Ennius Stål, 1861
 Eocanthecoma Bergroth, 1915
 Eocanthecona Bergroth, 1915
 Eonymia Linnavuori, 1982
 Erachtheus Stål, 1861
 Eribotes Stål, 1867
 Erthesina Spinola, 1837
 Eudolycoris Tamanini, 1959
 Eudryadocoris Linnavuori, 1975
 Eurus Dallas, 1851
 Eurydema Laporte
 Eurysaspis Signoret, 1851
 Eusarcoris Hahn
 Euschistus Dallas, 1851
 Euthyrhynchus Dallas, 1851
 Everardia 
 Eysarcoris Hahn, 1834
 Fecelia Stål, 1872
 Flaminia 
 Galedanta Amyot & Serville, 1843
 Gellia Stål, 1864
 Glaucias Kirkaldy, 1908
 Glottaspis Bergroth, 1918
 Glypsus Dallas, 1851
 Gonopsis Amyot & Serville, 1843
 Grammedessa 
 Graphosoma Laporte, 1833
 Gulielmus Distant, 1901
 Gynenica Dallas, 1851
 Halyabbas Distant, 1900
 Halyomorpha Mayr, 1864
 Halys Fabricius 1803
 Hermolaus Distant, 1902
 Heteroscelis Latreille, 1829
 Hippotiscus Bergroth, 1906
 Holcogaster Fieber, 1861
 Holcostethus Fieber, 1860
 Homalogonia Jakolev, 1876
 Hoplistodera Westwood, 1837
 Humria Linnavuori, 1975
 Hymenarcys Amyot & Serville, 1843
 Hypatropis Bergroth, 1891
 Hypsithocus Bergroth, 1927
 Hyrmine Stål, 1876
 Jalla C.W.Hahn, 1832
 Janeirona Distant, 1911
 Kalkadoona Distant, 1910
 Kapunda Distant, 1911
 Kayesia Schouteden, 1903
 Kermana Rolston & McDonald, 1981
 Lakhonia Descarpentries & Villiers, 1967
 Laprius Stål, 1861
 Lattinidea Rider & Eger, 2008
 Lelia Walker, 1867
 Lerida Karsch, 1894
 Lincus Stål, 1867
 Lineostethus Ruckes, 1966
 Lobepomis Berg, 1891
 Lopadusa Stål, 1858
 Loxa Amyot & Serville, 1843
 Macropygium Spinola, 1837
 Macrorhaphis Dallas, 1851
 Madates Strand, 1910
 Mayrinia Horváth, 1925
 Mcphersonarcys 
 Mecidea Dallas, 1851  (narrow stink bugs)
 Mecistorhinus Dallas, 1851
 Mecosoma Dallas, 1851
 Megarrhamphus Laporte, 1832
 Memmia Stål, 1864
 Menecles Stål, 1867
 Menida Motschoulsky, 1862
 Minchamia Gross, 1976
 Monteithiella Gross, 1976
 Mormidea Amyot & Serville, 1843
 Morna 
 Moromorpha Rolston, 1978
 Murgantia Stål, 1862
 Mustha Amyot & Serville, 1843
 Mycoolona Distant, 1910
 Myota Spinola, 1850
 Neagenor Bergroth, 1891
 Nealeria Bergroth, 1893
 Neapodops Slater & Baranowski, 1970
 Neoacledra 
 Neohalys Ahmad & Perveen, 1982
 Neojurtina Distant, 1921
 Neopharnus Van Duzee, 1910
 Neostrachia Saunders, 1877
 Neotibilis Grazia & Barcellos, 1994
 Neottiglossa Kirby, 1837
 Nezara Amyot & Serville, 1843
 Niphe Stål, 1867
 Notius Dallas, 1851
 Notopodops Barber & Sailer, 1953
 Novatilla Distant, 1888
 Ochlerus Spinola, 1837
 Ochrophara 
 Ocirrhoe Stål, 1876
 Odmalea Bergroth, 1915
 Oebalus Stål, 1862
 Oechalia Stål, 1862
 Oenopiella Bergroth, 1891
 Okeanos Distant, 1911
 Omyta Spinola, 1850
 Oncocoris Mayr, 1866
 Oncozygia Stål, 1872
 Oplomus Spinola, 1840
 Orthoschizops 
 Otantestia Breddin, 1900
 Padaeus Stål, 1862
 Pallantia Stål, 1862
 Palomena Mulsant & Rey 1866
 Pantachoa 
 Pantochlora Stål, 1870
 Paracritheus Bergroth, 1891
 Paraedessa Silva & Fernandes, 2013
 Parajalla Distant, 1911
 Parantestia Linnavuori, 1973
 Paterculus Distant, 1902
 Pausias 
 Pelidnocoris Stål, 1867
 Pellaea Stål, 1872
 Peltasticus Dallas, 1851
 Pentatoma Latreille 1802
 Peribalus Mulsant & Rey, 1866
 Perillus Stål, 1862
 Peromatus Amyot & Audinet-Serville, 1843
 Phalaecus Stål, 1862
 Pharypia Stål, 1861
 Phoeacia Stål, 1862
 Phricodus Spinola, 1839
 Phyllocephala Laporte, 1832
 Picromerus Amyot & Serville, 1843
 Piezodorus Fieber, 1860
 Pinthaeus Stål, 1868
 Placosternum Amyot & Serville, 1843
 Platacantha 
 Platycarenus Fieber, 1860
 Platycoris 
 Platynopus Amyot & Serville, 1843
 Plautia Stål, 1864
 Podisus Herrich-Schaeffer, 1851
 Pododus Amyot & Serville, 1843
 Podops Laporte, 1833
 Poecilometis Dallas, 1851
 Polycarmes Stål, 1867
 Priassus Stål, 1867
 Prionaca Dallas, 1851
 Prionosoma Uhler, 1863
 Protestrica Schouteden, 1905
 Proxys Spinola, 1840
 Pseudapines Bergroth, 1911
 Pseudatelus Linnavuori, 1982
 Pseudevoplitus Ruckes, 1958
 Putonia Stl, 1872
 Pygoda Amyot & Audinet-Serville, 1843
 Ramosiana Kormilev, 1950
 Rhacognathus Fieber, 1861
 Rhaphigaster Laporte de Castelnau, 1833
 Rhynchocoris Westwood, 1837
 Rhyncholepta Bergroth, 1911
 Rhyssocephala Rider, 1991
 Rio Kirkaldy, 1909
 Roferta Rolston, 1981
 Rolstoniellus Rider, 1997
 Rubiconia 
 Runibia Stål, 1861
 Sabaeus Stål, 1867
 Saceseurus Breddin, 1900
 Schraderiellus Rider, 1998
 Schyzops Spinola, 1837
 Sciocoris Fallén, 1829
 Scotinophara Stål, 1867
 Scribonia Stål, 1864
 Sepontia Stål, 1864
 Serbana Distant, 1906
 Sibaria Stål, 1872
 Spinalanx Rolston & Rider, 1988
 Stagonomus Gorski, 1852
 Staria Dohrn, 1860
 Starioides Matsumura, 1913
 Steleocoris Mayr, 1864
 Stenozygum Fieber, 1861
 Sternodontus Mulsant & Rey, 1856
 Stictochilus Bergroth, 1918
 Stiretrus Laporte, 1833
 Storthecoris Horváth, 1883
 Strachia Hahn, 1833
 Supputius Distant, 1889
 Surenus 
 Tachengia China, 1925
 Tarisa Amyot & Serville, 1843
 Taurocerus Amyot & Serville, 1843
 Tepa Rolston & McDonald, 1984
 Testrica Walker, 1867
 Tetroda Amyot & Serville, 1843
 Theloris Stål, 1864
 Theseus Stål, 1867
 Tholagmus Stål, 1860
 Tholosanus Distant, 1899
 Thyanta Stål, 1860
 Tibraca Stal, 1860
 Tinganina Bergroth, 1909
 Tolumnia Stål, 1867
 Tornosia Bolívar, 1879
 Trichopepla Stål, 1867
 Tricompastes Cachan, 1952
 Tripanda Berg, 1899
 Trochiscocoris Reuter, 1890
 Troilus Stål, 1867
 Tropicorypha Mayr, 1864
 Tylospilus Stål, 1870
 Tynacantha Dallas, 1851
 Tyoma Spinola, 1850
 Tyrannocoris 
 Udonga Distant, 1921
 Ventocoris Hahn, 1834
 Veterna Stål, 1864
 Vilpianus Stål, 1860
 Vitellus Stål, 1865
 Vulsirea Spinola, 1837
 Weda Schouteden, 1905
 Zaplutus Bergroth, 1893
 Zicrona Amyot & Serville, 1843
 † Carpocoroides Jordan, 1967
 † Deryeuma Piton, 1940
 † Halynoides Jordan, 1967
 † Necanicarbula Zhang, 1989
 † Olbia 
 † Pentatomoides Jordan, 1967
 † Pseudopalomena Jordan, 1967
 † Rhomboidea Jordan, 1967
 † Suspectocoris Jordan, 1967

References